Harish may refer to: Aadhar Card dekhna hai

Places
Harish, Israel, a town in Israel
Arish, Iran (also known as Harish), a village in South Khorasan Province, Iran
Arasht, Zanjan (also known as Harish), a village in Zanjan Province, Iran

People
Harish (Tamil actor), full name Arish Kumar, Indian film actor
Harish Bhadani (1933–2009), Indian poet
Harish Bhimani (born 1956), voice over artist
Harish Chandra Burnwal, Indian Journalist and writer
Harish Chandra Durgapal, Indian politician
Harish Chandra Mehrotra, Mathematician
Harish Chandra Mitra (1837–1872), Bengali playwright and poet
Harish Chandra Mukherjee (1824–1861), Indian journalist
Harish Hande, Magsaysay Award Winner
Harish Iyer (born 1979), Indian activist (gay rights, child rights)
Harish Kalyan (born 1990), Tamil actor
Harish Kapadia (born 1945), Indian Himalayan mountaineer
Harish Khare, Indian newspaper editor
Harish Manwani (born 1954), chief operating officer of Unilever
Harish Nagpal (born 1964), Indian politician
Harish Patel (born 1953), Indian Bollywood actor
Harish Raghavendra (born 1976), Indian singer
Harish Raj (born 1976), Kannada actor
Harish Rawat (born 1948), Indian politician
Harish Saluja, American filmmaker
Harish Salve (born 1955), Indian lawyer
Harish Shankar (born 1977), Telugu director
Harish Sharma (born 1932), Fiji politician
Harish Verma, Indian Bollywood actor
Yohannes Harish, Eritrean soccer player

See also
Hari, Hindu deity Vishnu
Haris (disambiguation)
Harish Chandra (disambiguation)
Harish Khanna (disambiguation)
Harish Kumar (disambiguation)
Harish Mehta (disambiguation)
Harris (disambiguation)

Indian masculine given names